The Pilgrims of St. Michael (the "white berets") is a Roman Catholic organization in Canada that promotes social credit economic theories in Canada and other countries.

Description
The Pilgrims of St. Michael were founded in Canada in 1939 by Louis Even and Gilberte Côté-Mercier to "promote the development of a better world, a more Christian society, through the diffusion and the implementation of the teachings of the Roman Catholic Church, in every sector of society, especially the economic field."

The Pilgrims of St. Michael wear white berets in their apostolate work, which consists of holding meetings, distributing leaflets, visiting families to pray with them a decade of the Rosary, and present to them social credit-based "solutions to the present economic injustices".

The organization publishes the Michael Journal five times a year in English (Michael), French (Vers Demain), Polish (Michael) and Spanish (San Miguel).

Michael is "a journal of Catholic patriots for the Social Credit monetary reform through the education of the population and not through political parties".

The organization claims that it has thousands of part-time apostles who give their spare time to visit families to make the Michael Journal known, and a core of full-time apostles who reside at the organization's headquarters in Rougemont, Quebec. Full-time apostles are mostly continuously on the road in different regions of Canada and other countries. The organization is volunteer-run, and its millions of free leaflets are financed by the donations of benefactors.

The French publication, Vers Demain, has been published since 1939, while the English version began in 1953, the Polish version in 1999, and the Spanish version in 2003. The Pilgrims print and distribute every year in every continent the equivalent of 30 million free 4-page offprints, translated into more than eight languages.

See also
Ralliement créditiste
Canadian social credit movement
Canadian Society of Medievalists
Catholic Civil Rights League
Salt + Light Television

External links
website of the Michael Journal

1939 establishments in Canada
Anti-communism in Canada
Anti-Marxism
Anti-Masonry
Anti-Zionism in Canada
Antisemitism in Canada
Anti-Protestantism
Anti-abortion organizations in Canada
Christian democracy
Christian political organizations
Christian organizations based in Canada
Catholic lay organisations
Catholicism in Canada
Conservatism in Canada
Canadian social credit movement
Clericalism
Counter-Enlightenment
Economy of Canada
Integralism
Jacobitism
Paleoconservatism
Paleolibertarianism
Romanticism
Federalism in Canada
Monarchism in Canada
Nationalism in Canada
Monarchist organizations
Anti-Islam sentiment in Canada
Political advocacy groups in Canada
Canadian nationalism
Catholic Church in Canada
Right-wing politics in Canada
Social conservatism
Toryism
Catholic orders and societies